Rhizocarpon diploschistidina is a species of crustose lichen in the family Rhizocarpaceae. Known from Colombia, it was described as new to science in 2011.

References

Lichens described in 2011
Fungi of South America
Rhizocarpaceae
Lichen species
Taxa named by Bruce McCune